"I Want Her" is a song by American R&B singer Keith Sweat.  As the first single from his debut album, Make It Last Forever, it reached number five on the Billboard Hot 100 and number one on the Hot R&B/Hip-Hop Singles & Tracks chart for three weeks. and became the most successful number one single of 1988 on the Billboard Hot R&B chart.  "I Want Her" also peaked at number 38 on the dance chart. The song topped the R&B Billboard Year-End chart for 1988. It was ranked number 6 on complex.com's list of 25 best new jack swing songs of all time.

Track listing

US 12" single
A1. I Want Her (Extended Version) (6:22)
A2. I Want Her (Accapella Dub Beat) (4:07)
B1. I Want Her (Instrumental) (2:42)
B2. I Want Her (LP Version) (5:58).

UK 12" single
A1. I Want Her (Extended Version) (6:22)
A2. I Want Her (Acapella Dub Beat) (4:07)
B1. I Want Her (Dance 'Til Ya Sweat Mix) (5:00)
B2. I Want Her (Instrumental) (2:42)

Charts

Year-end charts

See also
List of number-one R&B singles of 1988 (U.S.)
Billboard Year-End

References

1987 debut singles
1987 songs
Elektra Records singles
Keith Sweat songs
New jack swing songs
Song recordings produced by Teddy Riley
Songs written by Keith Sweat
Songs written by Teddy Riley